My Devil in Your Eyes is the second studio album by American metalcore band The Color Morale. It was released on March 8, 2011 through Rise Records and was produced by Joey Sturgis. It is the last album to feature guitarist John Bross, who left the band in 2011.

Critical reception

The album got mixed reviews. JesusFreakHideout rated the album 4 out of 5, writing: "Now, I know those have legitimate, non-offensive uses, but I felt unclear about whether they threw those lyrics in with the non-offensive meanings implied, to sound passionate, to sound mainstream, or to just create controversy. Regardless of its intentions, I was a little turned off by that because I'd been looking for some good God-loving Christian music and got a tiny surprise there. Aside from that, the length of the record is only 36 minutes and 10 songs, which seems a little short to me. But My Devil in Your Eyes is a good album, and everytime I start listening to it I'm satisfied with my purchase. I'd recommend it to fans of Sent By Ravens, I Am Alpha And Omega, Blessthefall, Ballast, and all that good post-hardcore stuff."

Track listing

Personnel
Credits adapted from AllMusic.

The Color Morale
 Garret Rapp – lead vocals, keyboards
 Ramon Mendoza – lead guitar
 John Bross – rhythm guitar, backing vocals
 Justin Hieser – bass, vocals
 Steve Carey – drums

Additional musicians
 Chad Ruhlig of For the Fallen Dreams – guest vocals on track 2, "Human(s)being"
 Kellin Quinn of Sleeping with Sirens – guest vocals on track 3, "The Dying Hymn"
 Chris Roetter of Like Moths to Flames – guest vocals on track 8, "Quote on Quote"

Additional personnel
 Joey Sturgis – engineering, mixing, mastering, production, guest vocals on track 6, "Demon Teeth"
 Nick Sampson – engineering, vocal editing
 Josh Schroeder – guest vocal tracking
 Jeff Dunne – editing
 Mark Hladish – logo design
 Sons of Nero – layout design

References

2011 albums
Rise Records albums
Albums with cover art by Sons of Nero
The Color Morale albums
Albums produced by Joey Sturgis